The Jackson Lawmakers were a Cotton States League minor league baseball team based in Jackson, Mississippi that played during the 1913 season. Managed by Otto Mills, the team finished first in the league's standings. It featured players Rags Faircloth and Alex Malloy.

References

Sports in Jackson, Mississippi
Defunct baseball teams in Mississippi
Defunct minor league baseball teams
Baseball teams established in 1913
1913 establishments in Mississippi
Baseball teams disestablished in 1913
Defunct Cotton States League teams